This is a list of notable companies that manufacture stuffed toys.

Canada
Ganz

Germany
Margarete Steiff GmbH
NICI AG
Sigikid
Teddy-Hermann

Japan
Nakajima USA
San-X
Sanrio
Sekiguchi Corporation

United Kingdom
Chad Valley
J. K. Farnell (defunct)
Merrythought
Teddy Atelier Stursberg

United States
 Applause Inc. (defunct)
 Boyds Bears
 Build-A-Bear Workshop
 Bunnies By The Bay
 GIANTmicrobes
 Gund
 Hallmark (Itty Bittys, Happy Go Luckys)
 Ideal Toy Company (defunct)
 Mary Meyer Corporation
 Ty
 Vermont Teddy Bear Company
 Squishmallows

Italy
 Trudi

See also
 List of toys

References

External links

Stuffed toys
Manufacturers